The 1986 Tipperary Senior Hurling Championship was the 96th staging of the Tipperary Senior Hurling Championship since its establishment by the Tipperary County Board in 1887.

Kilruane MacDonaghs entered the championship as the defending champions.

On 28 September 1986, Borris-Ileigh won the championship after a 0-14 to 0-07 defeat of Kilruane MacDonaghs in the final at Semple Stadium. It was their sixth championship title overall and their first title since 1983. It remains their last championship triumph.

Results

Quarter-finals

Semi-finals

Final

Championship statistics

Top scorers

Overall

In a single game

References

Tipperary
Tipperary Senior Hurling Championship